Siah Manseh-ye Pain (also Romanized as Sīāh Manseh-ye Pā’īn; also known as Pā’īn Sīāh Mūneseh, Seyāh Mūneseh, Sīāh Mūneseh, and Sīāh Mūnseh) is a village in Lat Leyl Rural District, Otaqvar District, Langarud County, Gilan Province, Iran. At the 2006 census, its population was 329, in 85 families.

References 

Populated places in Langarud County